The Friasian age is a period of geologic time (16.3–15.5 Ma) within the Early Miocene epoch of the Neogene, used more specifically within the SALMA classification of South America. It follows the Santacrucian and precedes the Colloncuran age.

Etymology 
The age is named after the Río Frías Formation in the Aysén Basin, Patagonia, Chile.

Formations

Fossils

References

Bibliography 
Río Frías Formation
 
 
 
 
 

Castilletes Formation
 
 
 
 
 
 
 
 

Cerdas Beds
 

Chilcatay Formation
 
 
 
 

Cura-Mallín Group
 
 
 

Gran Bajo del Gualicho Formation
 

Parángula Formation
 

Pebas Formation
 
 

Río Foyel Formation
 
  

Río Yuca Formation
 

 
Miocene South America
Neogene Chile
.016Friasian